Priyutovo is a rural locality (a village) in Karachevsky District, Bryansk Oblast, Russia. The population was 4 as of 2010. There is 1 street.

Geography 
Priyutovo is located 24 km southwest of Karachev (the district's administrative centre) by road. Tsaryovo Zaymishche is the nearest rural locality.

References 

Rural localities in Karachevsky District